Dioxyna crockeri is a species of tephritid or fruit flies in the genus Dioxyna of the family Tephritidae.

Distribution
Galapagos Islands.

References

Tephritinae
Insects described in 1934
Diptera of South America